Stanley is a community in York County, in the Canadian province of New Brunswick; it was an incorporated village until the end of 2022.

On 1 January 2023, Stanley amalgamated with parts of four local service districts to form the new incorporated rural community of Nashwaak. The community's name remains in official use.

History

Stanley straddles the Nashwaak River 30 km north of Fredericton at the intersection of Route 107 and Route 620.  The area was colonized in 1833 when a group associated with the New Brunswick and Nova Scotia Land Company became interested in the area.  Early impressions of the land were not positive, with surveyors noting the rocky soil as one problem. The general remoteness of the location was also a problem.

Initial immigrants to Stanley arrived in three waves. The first was young children and teens from London. The second was farmers and tradesmen from the Eastern Borders of Scotland and England. The third arrived from the Isle of Skye.

In 1846,  were established as the Parish of Stanley. By 1951, there were 130 residences, and 149 stores and barns.

The village is home to the annual Stanley Fair, the longest continuously running agricultural fair in Canada. The first edition of the fair was held in October 1851, although it is now held in the summer.

The first sawmill was constructed at the bottom of Stanley hill in 1856, by the New Brunswick and Nova Scotia Land Company.

There were schools in Tay Creek, North Tay, Fredericksburg, Currieburg, Limekiln, Red Rock, English Settlement, Tay Falls, Tay Valley, Giants Glen, Ward Settlement, Cross Creek, Green Hill, Maple Grove, Williamsburg, and Napadogan.

After decades of economic decline the area may be set for a boom. The Trans-Canada Pipeline, natural gas exploration and a tungsten and molybdenum mine near Stanley. However there are concerns about the environmental impact these projects may have on the environment, including the Nashwaak River.

Demographics

Notable people

Matthew Wuest: Sports reporter and founder of CapGeek

See also
List of communities in New Brunswick

References

Village of Stanley 

Former villages in New Brunswick
Communities in York County, New Brunswick